The Tianjin–Shanhaiguan railway or Jinshan railway is a railway line in China between Tianjin and Shanhaiguan. The line is 303 km long and starts serves Tianjin, Tanggu, Tangshan, Qinhuangdao and Shanhaiguan railway stations. The railway was originally part of the Beijing–Harbin railway but was renamed when the Beijing–Harbin railway was merged with the Beijing–Qinhuangdao railway.

References

See also 

 Rail transport in China
 List of railways in China

Railway lines in China
Rail transport in Tianjin